The Jualpa Mining Camp, also known as the Last Chance Basin Camp, is a former gold mining camp, just outside the city of Juneau, Alaska. Its main building is now operated as the Last Chance Mining Museum by the Gastineau Historical Society. The camp was the site of one of the largest gold finds in the Juneau mining district. It was established between 1910 and 1913 by the Alaska-Juneau Gold Mining Company and operated until 1944, producing more than $80 million worth of gold. Also surviving are a variety of railroad-related resources, which the company used to bring or to its mill on the Gastineau channel, an electrical transformer house, powder magazine, and cable hoist.

The camp, with a total of 21 contributing buildings and structures, was listed on the National Register of Historic Places in 1993.

See also
National Register of Historic Places listings in Juneau, Alaska

References

External links

 Last Chance Mining Museum - Gastineau Historical Society

Industrial buildings and structures on the National Register of Historic Places in Alaska
Museums established in 1910
Historic districts on the National Register of Historic Places in Alaska
Mining museums in Alaska
Museums in Juneau, Alaska
Gold mining in Alaska
Buildings and structures on the National Register of Historic Places in Juneau, Alaska